Vestiena Parish is an administrative unit of Madona Municipality in the Vidzeme region of Latvia.

Towns, villages and settlements of Vestiena parish 

Parishes of Latvia
Madona Municipality
Vidzeme